The American Planning Association (APA) is a professional organization representing the field of urban planning in the United States. APA was formed in 1978, when two separate professional planning organizations, the American Institute of Planners and the American Society of Planning Officials, were merged into a single organization. The American Institute of Certified Planners is now the organization's professional branch.

Functions 
Like many professional organizations, the American Planning Association's main function is to serve as a forum for the exchange of ideas between people who work in the field of urban planning. The organization keeps track of the various improvement efforts underway around the country, which may include the improvement or construction of new parks, highways and roads, or residential developments. The organization is also a starting point for people looking for employment.

The association also publishes the Journal of the American Planning Association (JAPA). JAPA was founded in 1935 as Planners' Journal, and was from 1943 known as Journal of the American Institute of Planners.

National Planning Conference
The American Planning Association holds an annual national conference that attracts planners, local government officials, planning commissioners, advocates and planning students from across the United States, Canada and the world. Each conference hosts several hundred individual sessions with thousands of attendees.

Chapters 
The association has 47 state/regional chapters, such as the NJAPA (New Jersey Chapter of the APA)  or the Western Central Chapter of the APA. APA members in the United States are required to belong to a local chapter. Many APA Chapters meet regularly, and most are a source for local conferences and education, networking. Each of 47 local chapters publishes a newsletter and maintains a presence on the web and on social media.

Divisions 
To manage the various interests of American planners, APA has 21 divisions. APA divisions offer professional networking opportunities for planners. They also produce newsletters and special publications, develop conference sessions, collaborate with related organizations, and contribute to policy work.

References

External links 
American Planning Association
JAPA
Annual National Planning Conference

Professional planning institutes
Professional associations based in Chicago
Urban planning in the United States
1978 establishments in the United States
Organizations established in 1978